Torre de Francia is a residential skyscraper in Valencia, Spain. Completed in 2002, has 35 floors and rises 115 metres. This is the second tallest building in Valencia, after Hilton Valencia.

See also 

 List of tallest buildings in Valencia

References 

Skyscrapers in Valencia
Residential skyscrapers in Spain
2002 establishments in Spain
Residential buildings completed in 2002